was a Japanese politician.  He served as governor of Kanagawa Prefecture from April 23, 1967 until April 22, 1975.

Tsuda was born in Kosugi, Toyama and died at the age of 89 of colorectal cancer in Yokohama.

External links 
 Bungo Tsuda obituary (Japanese)

References 

1918 births
2007 deaths
People from Toyama Prefecture
University of Tokyo alumni
Governors of Kanagawa Prefecture
Deaths from colorectal cancer
Deaths from cancer in Japan
Date of birth unknown